Dum Mastam is a 2022 Pakistani Romantic drama comedy film directed by Mohammed Ehteshamuddin, and produced by Adnan Siddiqui and Akhtar Hasnain under Cereal Entertainment. Written by Amar Khan. It stars Imran Ashraf and Amar Khan along with Sohail Ahmed, Saleem Meraj and Momin Saqib in supporting roles. The film was released on Eid al-Fitr, 3 May 2022, by Hum Films.

Plot
The film revolves around two individuals from the Walled City of Lahore. Aliya, an ambitious and full of dreams girl who craves to become a big dancer and Sikandar Hayat Khan a.k.a. Bao, Aliya's neighbour who loves her. Being neighbours, they both have good relation with each other but Aliya has never thought about it. When Bao confesses his feelings for her, she denies straighly as she wants to focus on her dream. However, Bao sends his parents to her house with his proposal where she along with her family insults them. Bao bares it and tells her that she has left from his heart as she has disrespectful his parents.

In dance class, Aliya meets with an accident and one of her legs becomes fractured due to Bao's mistake who leaves the rope of wheel, where she was sitting. It becomes impossible for her to fulfil the dream of becoming dancer with the fractured leg, so she decides to marry him. She asks Bao for marry her after which they both get marry.

Cast
 Amar Khan as Aliya, Sikandar's love interest
 Imran Ashraf as Sikandar "Bao" Aliya's love interest
 Sohail Ahmed as Bao's father
 Saleem Meraj as Arif Tootiwala
 Momin Saqib as Guddu Razor
 Adnan Shah Tipu
 Saife Hassan
 Faiza Gillani
 Uzma Beg
 Tahira Imam
 Agha Mustafa Hassan
 Tayyab Mahmood Sheikh

cameo appearance  
Rahat Fateh Ali Khan as (Himself) 
Adnan Siddiqui as (Director)
Wajahat Rauf as Voice Over Man 
Arslan Naseer as CBA (Himself) 
Taimoor Salahuddin as Mooroo
Buraq Shabbir as (Himself)
Hassan Chaudhry as Journalist
Omair Alavi as (Himself)
Maliha Rehman as (Herself)
Kiran Malik as Dancer
Ali Hayat Rizvi as Stage actor
Nigah Jee as Choreographer

Production
Adnan Siddiqui announced on 25 October 2019 that he began the production of his new film, titled Dum Mastam under his Cereal Entertainment, with an intention to release it in 2020. He further said that he did not want to star himself. Written by Amar Khan as her dream project to be directed by Ehteshamuddin, she had not wished to be in lead cast in her own story, until been selected by the director. Ashraf also said that he came in for another project for a small role, before he got this role in a sudden. While both the leads have already been working in Pakistani dramas, including 2018's fame Belapur Ki Dayan and Ranjha Ranjha Kardi respectively, they are set to debut in the Pakistan film industry with this.

Filming took place in two spells respectively; 60 percent in Lahore and 40 percent in Karachi, with some mid gap in January 2020, while a music video has been shot in different locations across Pakistan. However, principal photography was paused due to the COVID-19 pandemic in Pakistan in March 2020; the last few days' shoot was then completed in October after the lockdown restrictions started lifting, followed by the post-production phase taking place till completion in July 2021.

Meme sensation Momin Saqib is also set to make his film debut. Music is done by Naveed Nashad, Shiraz Uppal, Azaan Sami Khan, Bilal Saeed and Shani Arshad, with singers Ali Tariq, Neha Chaudhry, Beena Khan, Sarmad Qadeer, and Waqas Ali; while lyrics for 2 songs are by Shakeel Sohail. Cinematography is done by Suleman Razzak, while complete cast and crew was revealed on 12 July 2021.

Soundtrack

Release
First poster was revealed on 5 July 2021 at 5th Hum Style Awards, signing Hum Films in. After delays, release date of Eid al-Fitr, in May 2022, was finalized after cinemas re-started in Pakistan, and film trailer was released in a trailer launch hosted by Sanam Jung at Pearl-Continental Hotels & Resorts, Karachi, on 24 February. It had a world television premiere on Eid al-Adha, 10 July 2022, on Hum TV.

Reception

Critical response 
The film received mixed to negative reviews from critics towards its storyline, screenplay and performances. especially Ashraf's performance receive criticism, Stated Minus -Imran Ashraf's over acting (same notch of bhola) failed to impress the audience and Amar khan is too stiff to be a romantic heroine -her awkwardness is clearly visible in intense scenes terrible performance with no sense of acting.  
The main culprit was the length of the film which couldve been a lot better. Though music was highly praised from critics and audience getting top trending on YouTube.

References

External links

Pakistani romantic comedy films
Films shot in Karachi
Films shot in Lahore
Films set in Lahore
Films shot in Pakistan
Pakistani romantic musical films
Punjabi-language Pakistani films
Hum films
2020s Urdu-language films
2022 romantic comedy films
Films postponed due to the COVID-19 pandemic
Films impacted by the COVID-19 pandemic
Urdu-language Pakistani films